John S. Henderson is a professor of Italian Renaissance history at Birkbeck College, University of London.

Selected publications
Piety and Charity in Late Medieval Florence, Clarendon Press, Oxford, 1994, xviii + 545 pages; revised paperback ed.: Chicago University Press, 1997, xviii + 533 pages.
Italian translation: Pieta' e carita' nella Firenze del Basso Medioevo, Casa Editrice Le Lettere, Florence, 1998, pp. 545.
The Great Pox. The French Disease in Renaissance Europe, with J. Arrizabalaga and R. French (Yale University Press, 1997).
The Renaissance Hospital. Healing the Body and Healing the Soul (New Haven and London: Yale University Press, 2006), xxxiv + 458 pages.
German translation: Das Spital im Florenz der Renaissance – Heilung für den Leib und für die Seele (Steiner Verlag, Stuttgart, 2013)
Italian translation: L'Ospedale Rinascimentale. La cura del corpo e la cura dell'anima (Odoya, Bologna, 2016)
Florence Under Siege: Surviving Plague in an Early Modern City (Yale University Press, 2019).

Edited volumes
Charity and the Poor in Late Medieval and Renaissance Europe: England and Italy Compared in Continuity and Change, 3.ii (1988), 176 pages.
[ed. with T.V. Verdon], Christianity and the Renaissance, Syracuse University Press, 1990, xviii + 611 pages.
[ed. with R. Wall], Poor Women and Children in the European Past, Routledge, 1994, xiii + 347 pages.
[ed. With A. Pastore], 'Medicina dell'Anima , Medicina del Corpo: l'Ospedale in Europa tra Medio Evo ed Età Moderna: Special number of Medicina e Storia, III (2003), 134 pages.
The Impact of Hospitals in Europe 1000–2000: People, Landscapes, Symbols, 'Introduction' and edited by John Henderson, Peregrine Horden, and Alessandro Pastore (Frankfurt am Main, Peter Lang, Autumn 2006), 426 pages.Teoria e pratica Medica. Rimedi e formacopee in età moderna, ‘Introduction’, ed. with M. Garbellotti, Medicina e storia, XV (2008), pp. 190.Plague and the City, eds, L. Englemann, J. Henderson, C. Lynteris (Routledge, London, 2018). 
Forthcoming: *Representing Infirmity in Renaissance Italy'', ed. Federica Jacobs and Jonathan Nelson (Routledge, London, 2020).

References

External links 
http://www.wolfson.cam.ac.uk/people/professor-john-henderson
http://birkbeck.academia.edu/JohnHenderson

Living people
Year of birth missing (living people)
Academics of Birkbeck, University of London
Alumni of the University of London
Alumni of the University of Cambridge
British historians